Oktyabrskoye is a rural locality (a village) in Bryansky District, Bryansk Oblast, Russia. The population was 222 as of 2010. There are 14 streets.

Geography 
Oktyabrskoye is located 17 km southeast of Glinishchevo (the district's administrative centre) by road. Tiganovo is the nearest rural locality.

References 

Rural localities in Bryansky District